Gnophaela latipennis, the wild forget-me-not moth, is a moth of the family Erebidae. It was described by Jean Baptiste Boisduval in 1852. It is found in the US states of Oregon and California. The habitat consists of open mixed hardwood-conifer forests, oak woodlands and open riparian areas near creeks, as well as in open ponderosa pine forests and mountain meadows.

The length of the forewings is 26 mm. The forewings and hindwings are black with few large translucent greenish-yellow spots. Adults are on wing from late May to early August.

The larvae feed on Cynoglossum grande, Cynoglossum occidentale, Hackelia californica, Mertensia and Myosotis species. They are black with lateral yellow patches and they are densely covered with hair tufts. The species overwinters as a second-instar larva.

References

 

Gnophaela
Moths described in 1852
Taxa named by Jean Baptiste Boisduval